The discography of Lostprophets, a British alternative rock band formed in Pontypridd, Wales, in 1997, contains five studio albums, three EPs, and seventeen singles.

The band's first album, The Fake Sound of Progress, was released through Visible Noise in the United Kingdom in November 2000 and was certified gold. The album produced two singles: "Shinobi vs. Dragon Ninja", which was successful in the US, peaking at number thirty-three on the Alternative Songs chart, and the title track "The Fake Sound of Progress".

The first single released from their second album, Start Something, was "Burn Burn" in November 2003, and was originally scheduled to be closely followed by the release of the album. The album was released in the UK in February 2004 and peaked at number four in the UK Albums Chart. The album has sold more than 2.5 million copies worldwide. The second track from Start Something, "Last Train Home", reached number one on the Alternative Songs chart in the US, and peaked at number eight in the UK, making it the band's first UK top-ten single. Other released singles include; "Wake Up (Make a Move)", "Last Summer" and "Goodbye Tonight". In 2004, the album was certified platinum by the British Phonographic Industry in the UK and gold by the RIAA in the US.

The band's third album, Liberation Transmission was released in the UK in June 2006 and put the band at the top of the UK Albums Chart for the first time; it was later certified silver in the UK.
Singles from the album were "Rooftops (A Liberation Broadcast)", which peaked at number eight, "A Town Called Hypocrisy", "Can't Catch Tomorrow (Good Shoes Won't Save You This Time)" and "4:AM Forever".

The band's fourth studio album The Betrayed was delayed many times. The title and several tracks were revealed in 5 August issue of Kerrang! magazine, and the album was released on 18 January 2010.

The band's fifth and final studio album Weapons was released on 2 April 2012.

Studio albums

EPs

Singles

Music videos

Other appearances

References
General

Specific

External links
Official website

Lostprophets at Musicbrainz

Discographies of British artists
Rock music group discographies